E93 may refer to:
 European route E93
 King's Indian Defense, Encyclopaedia of Chess Openings code
 Daini-Shinmei Road, route E93 in Japan

See also 
BMW 3 Series (E90)